Nabeel Qureshi may refer to:
Nabeel Qureshi (author) (1983–2017), American Christian apologist of Pakistani origin
Nabeel Qureshi (director) (born 1985), Pakistani film director